Afzaal Haider (born 12 December 1971) is a Pakistani-born Hong Kong cricketer.

Career
Haider has played two One Day Internationals for Hong Kong in addition to two first-class games for the team and several games for Lahore City in Pakistani domestic cricket. Haider is a specialist fast pace bowler, whose highest score with the bat is 22, coming in a 47-run eighth-wicket partnership with Manoj Cheruparambil against Pakistan at the 2004 Asia Cup. With the ball, his best figures are five for 23 against Nepal in the first-class 2005 ICC Intercontinental Cup tournament.

Haider began his career in Pakistan in 1991–92, playing three first-class games and three List A games for Pakistan University Grants Commission. He took five List A wickets, but was expensive, conceding runs at 5.5 an over - and was subsequently dropped. He then played five games for Lahore City, before moving to Hong Kong, who he has played four games for since making his debut in 2004.

Coaching career
Haider was appointed interim coach of Hong Kong in October 2009 following the resignation of Aftab Habib.

References 

Hong Kong One Day International cricketers
Hong Kong cricketers
Pakistani cricketers
Pakistan University Grants Commission cricketers
Pakistani emigrants to Hong Kong
Lahore City cricketers
1971 births
Living people
Cricketers from Lahore
Sportspeople of Pakistani descent
Hong Kong cricket coaches
Coaches of the Hong Kong national cricket team